Kundert is an Ortsgemeinde – a community belonging to a Verbandsgemeinde – in the Westerwaldkreis in Rhineland-Palatinate, Germany. The residential community of Kundert belongs to the Verbandsgemeinde of Hachenburg, a kind of collective municipality. Its seat is in the like-named town.

Geography

The community lies in the Westerwald between Limburg and Siegen, in the Kroppach Switzerland nature and landscape conservation area.

History
In 1346, Kundert had its first documentary mention under the name Kunderoed. Kundert was once an agriculturally oriented village, but nowadays is more a residential community.

Politics

The municipal council is made up of 6 council members who were elected in a majority vote in a municipal election on 13 June 2004.

Economy and infrastructure

Transport
South of the community runs Bundesstraße 414, leading from Hohenroth to Hachenburg. The nearest Autobahn interchanges are in Freudenberg, Siegen, Wilnsdorf and Herborn on the A 45 (Dortmund–Gießen). The nearest InterCityExpress stop is the railway station at Montabaur on the Cologne-Frankfurt high-speed rail line.

Public institutions
The community has at its disposal a public football ground and playground, a well-developed hiking path network, its own barbecue pavilion and two timber-frame houses of the Kinderkrebshilfe Unnau (“Unnau Children’s Cancer Help”). There is also a community bakehouse in Kundert with a long baking tradition. Furthermore, there is a mixed choir that contributes considerably to community life.

References

External links
 Kundert in the collective municipality’s Web pages 
 Historical view of the community 

Municipalities in Rhineland-Palatinate
Westerwaldkreis